Johann Heinrich Cotta, also Heinrich von Cotta, (30 October 1763 – 25 October 1844) was a German silviculturist who was a native of Kleine Zillbach, near Wasungen, Thuringia. He was founder of the Royal Saxon Academy of Forestry, in Tharandt, and is known as a pioneer of scientific forestry. He was the father of the geologist Bernhard von Cotta (1808–1879).

Education and early career
Cotta reportedly said of himself:

"I am a child of the forest; no roof covers the spot where I was born. Old oaks and beeches shade its solitude and grass grows upon it. The first song I heard was of the birds of the forest, my first surroundings were trees. Thus my birth determined my calling!"

Initially learning forestry from his father, in 1784–85 Cotta enrolled at the University of Jena, where he studied mathematics, natural sciences and cameralism (public administration). In 1785, he returned to Zillbach to teach forestry at one of the earliest master schools of forestry, with his father. In 1801 he became a member of the forestry college in Eisenach, while continuing his work at Zillbach. During this time his reputation grew, and in 1810 Cotta was appointed director of Forstvermessung und Taxation (Forest Mensuration and Taxation) by Frederick Augustus I of Saxony.

Founder of the Royal Saxon Academy of Forestry
In 1811, he established a forestry school at Tharandt, near Dresden, together with its arboretum, the Forstbotanischer Garten Tharandt, still in existence. The school later would be known as the Royal Saxon Academy of Forestry; and lives on today as site of the Department of Forestry of Dresden University of Technology. The new forestry school attracted students throughout Europe, and in 1813 was visited by Johann Wolfgang von Goethe. In 1841, Cotta was given an award by Tsar Nicholas I in recognition of his efforts at Tharandt.

Pioneer of modern forestry
Cotta was a pioneer of modern forestry, and was a catalyst concerning the transition from "timber production" to forestry as a scientific discipline. Cotta's methodology was based on a geometric survey of the forest, where calculations of the wood mass of individual trees as well as the yield of the entire forested region were made. By way of these calculations an estimate for the monetary worth of a forest could be assessed. In 1804 Cotta was the first to suggest the concept of a "volume table", which was a chart that was introduced decades later to aid in the estimation of standing timber volume. In 1816, Cotta wrote: 
"Three principal causes exist why forestry is still so backward: first, the long time which wood needs for its development; second, the great variety of sites on which it grows; thirdly, the fact that the forester who practices much writes but little, and he who writes much practices but little."

Paleontogical interests
Cotta also had a keen interest in geology and fossils, and during his career amassed an impressive collection  of zoological and botanical fossils. Today, pieces of this collection are kept at Humboldt University of Berlin (Institute for Paleontology), in the museum for natural history in Chemnitz, at the Academy of Mining in Freiberg, in the State Natural History Collections in Dresden and in the Natural History Museum in London.

Published works 
 Systematische Anleitung zur Taxation der Waldungen (Systematic Instructions for Taxation of Forests), Berlin 1804
 Naturbeobachtungen über die Bewegung und Funktion des Saftes in den Gewächsen, mit vorzüglicher Hinsicht auf Holzpflanzen (Natural Observations on the Movement and Function of Sap in Crops, with Particular Respect to Woodyplants.), Weimar 1806
 Grundriß zu einem System der Forstwissenschaft (Outline on a System of Forest Science), 1813
 Tafeln zur Bestimmung des Inhalts und Wertes unverarbeiteter Hölzer (Tables for Determining the Content and Values of Unprocessed Timber), Dresden (1816 to 1897, seventeen editions)
 Anweisung zum Waldbau (Directions for Silviculture), Dresden 1817
 Die Verbindung des Feldbaues mit dem Waldbau oder die Baumfeldwirtschaft(The Connection of Agriculture with Silviculture or Economic Tree Cultivation), Dresden 1819-1822
 Anweisung zur Forsteinrichtung und Abschätzung (Directions for Forest Management Planning and Assessment), Dresden 1820
 Grundriß der Forstwissenschaft (Outline of Forest Science), Dresden und Leipzig 1832
 Der Kammerbühl nach wiederholten Untersuchungen aufs neue beschrieben(The Kammerbühl Newly Described After Repeated Investigations), Dresden 1833

References 

Note: Parts of this article are based on a translation of an article from the German Wikipedia.

Further reading
 Lowood, Henry E. 1990. "The Calculating Forester: Quantification, Cameral Science, and the Emergence of Scientific Forestry Management in Germany", pp. 315–343, in The Quantifying Spirit in the Eighteenth Century, eds. Tore Frängsmyr, J. L. Heilbron, and Robin E. Rider. Berkeley: University of California Press.

1763 births
1844 deaths
People from Schmalkalden-Meiningen
Forestry academics
German foresters
History of forestry education
University of Jena alumni
Academic staff of the Royal Saxon Academy of Forestry